New Zealand vs Tonga in rugby league is a rivalry between the New Zealand national rugby league team and the Tonga national rugby league team in the sport of rugby league. The first match played between the two sides was a 25–24 win by New Zealand in 1995. The rivalry gained traction in 2017, when a number of high-profile New Zealand representatives, let by Jason Taumalolo, defected and decided to play for Tonga, their nation of heritage, instead.

Head to head

Results

1990s

2000s

2010s

References

External links 
 New Zealand vs Tonga – Rugby League Project

Rugby league rivalries
New Zealand national rugby league team
Tonga national rugby league team
Sports rivalries in New Zealand